Li Quan is a Chinese lightweight rower. 

At the 2003 World Rowing Championships in Milan, Italy, she won a gold medal in the lightweight women's quadruple sculls.

References

Chinese female rowers
Year of birth missing (living people)
World Rowing Championships medalists for China
Living people